J. D. Leftwich High School is a comprehensive public high school located in Magazine, Arkansas, United States. The school provides secondary education in grades 7 through 12 for students in Magazine and the surrounding unincorporated communities of Logan County, Arkansas. It is one of four public high schools in Logan County and the sole high school administered by the Magazine School District.

Academics 
J. D. Leftwich High School is a Title I school that is accredited by the ADE.

In 2012, J. D. Leftwich High School was nationally recognized as a Bronze Medalist in the Best High Schools Report developed by U.S. News & World Report.

Curriculum 
The assumed course of study follows the Smart Core curriculum developed by the Arkansas Department of Education (ADE), which requires that students complete at least 22 units prior to graduation. Students complete regular coursework and exams and may take Advanced Placement (AP) courses and exams, with the opportunity to receive college credit.

Athletics 
The J. D. Leftwich High School mascot is the Rattlers, with red and black serving as the school colors. The J. D. Leftwich Rattlers compete in interscholastic activities within the 2A Classification, the second smallest classification administered by the Arkansas Activities Association. The Rattlers play within the 2A Region 4 Conference in football and 2A Region 4 East in basketball. J. D. Leftwich fields junior varsity and varsity teams in football, basketball (boys/girls), cheer, baseball, fastpitch softball, and track and field (boys/girls).

References

External links 
 

Public high schools in Arkansas
Public middle schools in Arkansas
Schools in Logan County, Arkansas